Csaba Kőrösi (born 1958) is a Hungarian diplomat currently serving as President of the 77th United Nations General Assembly. He was previously Director of Environmental Sustainability in the Office of the President of Hungary.

Early life and education
Born in Szeged, Hungary, in 1958, Kőrösi studied at the Moscow Institute of International Relations (Russia), the University of Leeds Institute of International Relations (United Kingdom), the Truman Institute for Middle East Studies at the Hebrew University of Jerusalem (Israel), and Harvard Kennedy School at Harvard University (United States of America).

Career
Kőrösi joined the Ministry of Foreign Affairs in 1983 and served in various countries, including Greece, Israel and Libya. He was also the Permanent Representative of Hungary to the United Nations and served as vice-president of the General Assembly from 2011 to 2012. He was Deputy State Secretary responsible for security policy, multilateral diplomacy and human rights before being appointed Director of Environmental Sustainability in the Office of the President of Hungary.

President of the United Nations General Assembly
On 7 June 2022, Kőrösi was elected to serve as President of the United Nations General Assembly for its seventy-seventh session. He succeeded the previous President, Abdulla Shahid of Maldives, on 13 September 2022.

Awards
Kőrösi is a recipient of the Hungarian Order of Merit. He was also awarded the Order of Merit of the Republic of Poland, the Sovereign Military Order of Malta and the Greek Order of the Phoenix.

References

1958 births
Living people
People from Szeged
Hungarian diplomats
Moscow State Institute of International Relations alumni
Harvard Kennedy School alumni
Permanent Representatives of Hungary to the United Nations
Presidents of the United Nations General Assembly